Ani Poghosyan (born 4 June 2000) is an Armenian swimmer. She became Master of Sports at age of 13. Ani Poghosyan is a record holder of 100m (short course and long course) 200m (short course and long course) and 400m (short course and long course) freestyle. She competed in the women's 100 metre freestyle event at the 2017 World Aquatics Championships.

In 2019, she represented Armenia at the 2019 World Aquatics Championships held in Gwangju, South Korea. She competed in the women's 100 metre freestyle and women's 200 metre freestyle events. She also competed in two mixed relay events.

References

External links
 

2000 births
Living people
Place of birth missing (living people)
Armenian female freestyle swimmers